Lorenzo Unanue (born 22 March 1953) is a Uruguayan footballer. He played in nine matches for the Uruguay national football team from 1975 to 1979. He was also part of Uruguay's squad for the 1975 Copa América tournament.

References

External links
 

1953 births
Living people
Uruguayan footballers
Uruguay international footballers
Association football midfielders
Peñarol players
Atlético Potosino footballers
Coyotes Neza footballers
Tecos F.C. footballers
Uruguayan expatriate footballers
Expatriate footballers in Mexico